Mushfiq was a sub-imperial Mughal painter who worked in the atelier of Abd-ur-Rahim Khan-i-Khanan (also called Abdul Rahim Khan-I-Khana), commander-in-chief of the Mughal army in the late 16th/early 17th century. He contributed numerous paintings to the Ramayana and Razmnama (Mahabharata) manuscripts commissioned by the Khan-i-Khanan. Several individual paintings in his hand, some of them signed, are also known. He is not known to have worked at Akbar or Jahangir's imperial workshops.

External links 
The Emperors' album: images of Mughal India, an exhibition catalog from The Metropolitan Museum of Art (fully available online as PDF), which contains material on Mushfiq
Painting by Mushfiq in the Freer Ramayana

Mughal painters
Year of birth missing
Year of death missing
Indian male painters
16th-century Indian painters